The Joint Stock Theatre Company was founded in London 1974 by David Hare, Max Stafford-Clark Paul Kember and David Aukin. The director William Gaskill was also part of the company. It was primarily a company which presented new plays.

Joint Stock created a style of working with writers using company research to inspire workshops. From these workshops writers such as David Hare, Howard Brenton and Caryl Churchill would gather material to inspire a writing phase before rehearsals began. This methodology is sometimes referred to as The Joint Stock Method. Significant productions include Hare's Fanshen, Brenton's Epsom Downs, Stephen Lowe's Ragged Trousered Philanthropists and Churchill's Cloud Nine.

The company ceased to be active in 1989. In 1993 Max Stafford-Clark founded the touring company Out of Joint which shares some working practices with Joint Stock.

Productions

References

Ritchie, R. (ed.) (1987), The Joint Stock Book: Making of a Theatre Collective, London: Methuen, 
Stafford-Clark, M., and P. Roberts (2007), Taking Stock: The Theatre of Max Stafford-Clark, London: Nick Hern Books, 
 Baz Kershaw, "Building an unstable pyramid - the fragmentation of British alternative theatre", in New Theatre Quarterly, Volume XI, no. 36, November 1993; pp. 348-356.

External reference 

The Joint Stock Theatre Company on The Literary Encyclopedia
Joint Stock Theatre Group Archives at Special Collections Dept., University Library, University of California, Davis

Theatre companies in London
Arts organizations established in 1947